The 8th season of the television series Arthur was originally broadcast on PBS in the United States from September 15 to December 26, 2003 and contains 10 episodes. This is the last season with Mark Rendall and Patricia Rodriguez voicing Arthur and Sue Ellen Armstrong, respectively, as well as the last season before CINAR, the show's original production company, was rebranded as Cookie Jar Entertainment the following year. Evan Smirnow replaced Mitchell Rothpan as George and this season is the only one in which he voices the character. Alexina Cowan and Sally Taylor-Isherwood also replaced Patricia Rodriguez and Vanessa Lengies as the voices of Catherine and Emily, respectively.

Production
In a February 2022 interview with Variety, Marc Brown stated that the inspiration for the episode "Bleep" came from a young neighbor of his, who learned a swear word on the school bus.

Episodes

References 

General references 
 
 
 
 

2003 American television seasons
Arthur (TV series) seasons
2003 Canadian television seasons